Virginia's 7th House of Delegates district is one of 100 seats in the Virginia House of Delegates, the lower house of the state's bicameral legislature. District 7 covers all of Floyd County and portions of Montgomery County and Pulaski County. The district is represented by Republican Nick Rush.

In 2017, Rush, 49, was challenged by Democrat Flourette "Flo" Ketner, 34.

District officeholders

Electoral history

References

External links
 

007
Floyd County, Virginia
Montgomery County, Virginia
Pulaski County, Virginia